Matrusri Anasuya Devi (born 28 March 1923 – 1985), better known simply as Amma ["Mother"], was an Indian spiritual guru from Andhra Pradesh.

Early life
Anasuya Devi was an Indian guru from Jillellamudi (now partially known as Arkapuri),  Guntur District, in the state of Andhra Pradesh. Anasuya Devi was born in a small village in Andhra Pradesh, on March 28, 1923. to a couple late Seethapathi Rao, the village officer of Mannava and his wife Rangamma. Seethapathi and Rangamma after their loss of as many as five children. Rangamma conceived a child. and gave birth to Anasuya.

On 5 May 1936, Amma's wedding took place at Bapatla with Brahmandam Nageswara Rao who became later the village officer of Jillellamudi.

Charitable career
At Jillellamudi, as a young housewife, Amma looked after the needs of her family which came to include two sons and a daughter. In addition to performing her household duties, Amma devised and organized a grain bank to help the poor and needy. Amma used to give food to every visitor to the village.

She founded the common dining hall Annapurnalayam on 15 August 1958. This place serves simple vegetarian food day and night to all who came. In 1960, the "House of All" was founded to provide lodging to the residents and visitors.

Amma established a Sanskrit school in 1966 (now the Matrusri Oriental College and High School) and within a relatively short time, one could hear the inmates speaking Sanskrit fluently.

Amma saw only good in people and had no concept of "sin", treating all alike irrespective of faith and religion.

Death
Amma died on 12 June 1985. A temple Anasuyeswaralayam was built, in which a life size statue of Amma was installed in 1987.

Notes

External links

20th-century Hindu religious leaders
Indian religious leaders
Indian Hindu spiritual teachers
Telugu people
Hindu female religious leaders
Deified women
Social workers
1923 births
1985 deaths
20th-century Indian educators
People from Guntur district
20th-century Indian women
Scholars from Andhra Pradesh
Women educators from Andhra Pradesh
Educators from Andhra Pradesh
Indian Hindu saints
Indian women religious leaders
Social workers from Andhra Pradesh
20th-century women educators